CoolaData is a big data behavioral analytics platform for online web and mobile applications.

Cooladata was founded with the vision of developing an advanced BI and analytics platform that would be able to store unlimited amounts of data events in the cloud, while providing advanced user behavioral analytics, or in other words, providing the analytical capabilities and agility of an enterprise, at a fraction of the cost.

Founders 
CoolaData was founded by two veteran BI experts.  CoolaData's CEO Tomer Ben Moshe spent several years at Amdocs (NYSE:DOX), where he co-initiated and served as SVP, COO of Amdocs Cloud Services.  Before Amdocs Tomer was the CTO of Microsoft Israel, where he worked closely with software vendors, startups and the developer community.

Guy Greenberg, CoolaData's Co-Founder and President has more than twenty years of experience in Business Intelligence and Big Data. As co-founder and CEO of Gilon Business Insight, Israel’s largest provider of Business Intelligence, Guy turned Gilon into a multinational corporation with 300 employees, which was acquired by Ness Technologies in 2010. Guy was also a co-founder of Actimize, a market leader in financial crime, risk and compliance products which was acquired by NICE Systems (NASDAQ:NICE) in 2007. Guy is an active angel investor and adviser of Big Data startups. In July 2015, CoolaData offered a complete data warehouse with analytical services in SaaS mode.

Funding 
The company is backed by 83North (formerly Greylock IL), Salesforce Ventures and Carmel Ventures.

Customers 
CoolaData's customers include MySupermarket and Playbuzz.

Further reading
 CoolaData Blog from Archive.org
 INC Magazine: Why Behavioral Analytics are your Company's SecretWeapon
 Ha, Anthony (February 6, 2014), "CoolaData Takes Its Behavior- Focused Analytics Platform out of Beta" AOL Tech. Retrieved 2015-06-01.
 (October 22, 2013), "Big data analytics co CoolaData raises $7.4m" Globes Online, Israel business news. Retrieved 2015-06-01.

References

Business intelligence software
Analytics